Operation Hummingbird is a studio album by Death In June, released in 1999.

The album contains seven new songs recorded with Albin Julius of Der Blutharsch. It is considered a smaller, sister album to Take Care & Control.

Critical reception
AllMusic thought that "led by chanting vocals, 'The Snows of the Enemy (Little Black Baby)' and 'Let a Wind Catch a Rainbow on Fire' are eerily reminiscent of Britain's pre-Christian past."

Track listing 

 "Gorilla Tactics" – 1:45
 "Kapitulation" – 3:09
 "Flieger" – 6:02
 "The Snows of the Enemy (Little Black Baby)" – 6:15
 "Hand Grenades and Olympic Flames" – 2:58
 "Winter Eagle" – 3:53
 "Let the Wind Catch a Rainbow on Fire" – 4:07

References

Death in June albums
1999 albums